Centigrade is a 2007 thriller short film starring Colin Cunningham, Daniel Brodsky, and Bernhard Lachkovics about a man trapped in a trailer.  It won Leo Awards and awards at Method Fest Independent Film Festival and Cinequest Film Festival.  The producers are working to turn the short into a feature film.

Plot
A Man (Colin Cunningham) awakens one morning with a hangover to discover that he has been taken hostage aboard his old, run down trailer which is being towed down the highway by a mysterious black truck; he desperately tries to find a way out of the sealed vehicle before he burns inside.
Colin Cunningham describes the movie as follows: "Centigrade, in a nutshell, is about a guy who lives in an old dilapidated, busted-up trailer. There's no wheels on it. It's just laying dead in the weeds. [The owner] does a bad thing, and he wakes up in the morning and [the trailer is] rolling down the highway. It's being towed by a big, black pickup truck.  The doors won't open and the windows won't break and he can't get out. That's essentially what it's about. It's about a man trapped."

Production
The part of the main character was originally to go to another actor, but difficulties forced Cunningham to take the part himself.  The script was written 17 years ago; Madison Graie suggested to Cunningham that they apply for the Directors Guild of Canada's "Kickstart Program" to make Fahrenheit (Centigrade'''s original title).  The pair won one of the five Kickstart awards and used the $20,000 CAD prize to make the film.

Due to signing with Shorts International, Centigrade will be available on iTunes, the first Canadian live action short to appear there. Cunningham and Graie are working on turning Centigrade into a feature film.

Cast

Colin Cunningham as Man
Daniel Brodsky as Boy
Ron Sauvé as Man in Other Trailer
Bernhard Lachkovics as Black Truck Driver
Derrick Garland as Burgundy Truck Driver
Fulvio Cecere as Trailer Graveyard
Mark Rickerby as Trailer Graveyard
Madison Graie as Trailer Graveyard
Sterling Wong as Boy Double

Awards
Wins
2008: Cinequest Film Festival Award for Best Narrative Short Film (Madison Graie)
2008: Leo Award for Best Short Drama (Madison Graie, Derrick Garland)
2008: Leo Award for Best Direction in a Short Drama (Colin Cunningham)
2008: Leo Award for Best Performance by a Male in a Short Drama (Colin Cunningham)
2008: Leo Award for Best Make-Up in a Short Drama (Jayne Dancose)
2008: Leo Award for Best Overall Sound in a Short Drama (Real Gauvreau)
2008: Method Fest Independent Film Festival Award for Best actor in a Short Film (Colin Cunningham)Centigrade'''s Award for Best Narrative Short at Cinequest Film Festival qualifies it to be nominated for an Oscar.

Nominations
2008: Leo Award for Best Cinematography in a Short Drama (Kevin Hall)
2008: Leo Award for Best Picture Editing in a Short Drama (Jonathan Eric Tyrrell)
2008: Method Fest Independent Film Festival Award for Best Short Film
2008: Vancouver International Film Festival Award for Best Emerging Director (Colin Cunningham)

Official Selections
2008: Cannes Short Film Corner
2008: Jackson Hole Film Festival
2008: Palm Springs International Film Festival
2008: Santa Barbara International Film Festival

References

External links
 
 

2007 films
2007 horror films
Canadian drama short films
2007 short films
Canadian horror thriller films
2000s English-language films
2000s Canadian films